Amicus usque ad aras is a Latin phrase meaning "a friend as far as to the altar" "a life-long partner" “a friend to the very end."

The plural of amicus is amici leading to a separate usage of amici usque ad aras.
A song of the same name dates to the defunct Yale University greek organization Phi Theta Psi in 1864. The tune used comes from the traditional song Annie Lisle.

Phi Kappa Psi fraternity's song "Amici" includes the phrase "amici usque ad aras" and appears to be based on the Yale tune.

The phrase also appears in The Fraternity of Alpha Chi Rho’s song “Amici” and in the anthem song of 'Le Bourdon' of the 'Deltsch Studenten Corps' “Our Strong Bands”. It is considered one of its most important utterances

Recently this sentence is also used by two members of the K-pop group Ateez. Choi San and Jung Woo-young use this phrase to show the special relationship (friendship) bond they have. Woo-young has the tattoo on his right thigh and San has it in the same place.

References

Latin words and phrases